
Gmina Świerzno is a rural gmina (administrative district) in Kamień County, West Pomeranian Voivodeship, in north-western Poland.

Villages
Gmina Świerzno contains the villages and settlements of Będzieszewo, Chomino, Ciesław, Dąbrowa, Duniewo, Gostyń, Gostyniec, Grębice, Jatki, Kaleń, Kępica, Krzemykowo, Krzepocin, Margowo, Osiecze, Redliny, Rybice, Starza, Stuchowo, Sulikowo, Świerzno, Trzebieradz and Ugory.

Neighbouring gminas
Gmina Świerzno is bordered by the gminas of Dziwnów, Golczewo, Gryfice, Kamień Pomorski, Karnice and Rewal.

References
Polish official population figures 2006

Swierzno
Gmina Swierzno